Radio Shalom Dijon is a local associative radio station of Jewish sensitivity based in Dijon, France. As of 2006, its president is Denis Tenenbaum. Its programming includes Judaic heritage, culture, history, music, current events and activities etc.

It started its programming in 1992 and got the go ahead from CSA in August 2007. It broadcast on 97.1 FM in Dijon and 99.5 FM in Besançon.

External links
 Official website 

Radio stations in France
Mass media in Dijon
Jews and Judaism in France
Jewish radio

Radio stations established in 1992